Paulina Buziak-Śmiatacz (born 16 December 1986 in Mielec) is a Polish race walker. She competed in the 20 km kilometres event at the 2012 Summer Olympics.

Competition record

References

People from Mielec
Polish female racewalkers
1986 births
Living people
Olympic athletes of Poland
Athletes (track and field) at the 2012 Summer Olympics
Athletes (track and field) at the 2016 Summer Olympics
Sportspeople from Podkarpackie Voivodeship
Polish Athletics Championships winners
World Athletics Championships athletes for Poland